Wayne Fensham (born 3 December 1958) is a South African cricketer and field hockey player. He played in one first-class match for Eastern Province in 1981/82.

See also
 List of Eastern Province representative cricketers

References

External links
 

1958 births
Living people
South African cricketers
Eastern Province cricketers
Cricketers from Port Elizabeth
South African male field hockey players